Keith Lamar Lee (born December 22, 1957) is a former American football defensive back who played five seasons in the National Football League with the New England Patriots and Indianapolis Colts. He was drafted by the Buffalo Bills in the fifth round of the 1980 NFL Draft. He first enrolled at Santa Monica Community College before transferring to Colorado State University. Lee attended Gardena High School in Harbor Gateway, Los Angeles.

References

External links
Just Sports Stats
New England Patriots bio

Living people
1957 births
American football defensive backs
American football quarterbacks
Santa Monica Corsairs football players
Colorado State Rams football players
New England Patriots players
Indianapolis Colts players
Players of American football from San Antonio
Gardena High School alumni